Lo Mato (Si No Compra Este LP) is the eighth studio album of Willie Colón & Héctor Lavoe issued in 1973 by Fania Records. It was the fourth of Colón and Lavoe's records to go gold, after Cosa Nuestra (1970), La Gran Fuga (1971), and El Juicio (1972).

The cover shows a variant of the National Lampoon, January 1973 cover If you don't buy this magazine, we'll kill this dog. The man being held up on the cover, and reversing the roles with Willie on the floor on the reverse, was José R. Padrón.

Track listing 
"Calle Luna, Calle Sol" (Willie Colón) – 3:45
"Todo Tiene Su Final" (Willie Colón) – 5:00
"Guajira Ven" (D.R.) – 4:10
"La María" (C. Curet Alonso) – 3:30
"Señora Lola" (Emil "Chino" de Padrón) – 3:19
"El Día de Mi Suerte" (Willie Colón & Héctor Lavoe) – 5:28
"Vo So" (Willie Colón) – 4:25
"Junio '73" (Willie Colón) – 7:13

References

1973 albums
Willie Colón albums
Héctor Lavoe albums